Sidney Carr Mize (March 7, 1888 – April 26, 1965) was a United States district judge of the United States District Court for the Southern District of Mississippi.

Education and career

Born in Scott County, Mississippi, Mize received an Artium Baccalaureus degree from Mississippi College in 1908 and a Bachelor of Laws from the University of Mississippi School of Law in 1911. He was in private practice in Gulfport, Mississippi from 1911 to 1937. He became a special district attorney of Mississippi in 1914, and special county judge and a special chancery judge in 1930.

Federal judicial service

On January 30, 1937, Mize was nominated by President Franklin D. Roosevelt to a seat on the United States District Court for the Southern District of Mississippi vacated by Judge Edwin R. Holmes. Mize was confirmed by the United States Senate on February 2, 1937, and received his commission on February 3, 1937. He served as Chief Judge from 1961 to 1962, and remained on the court until his death on April 26, 1965.

Cases
In 1962, Mize ruled that there was no evidence that the University of Mississippi's admissions policy was based on the segregation of races, and therefore was legally correct in denying admittance to James Meredith, a Black applicant. The ruling was later overturned by the Fifth Circuit Court of Appeals, which remanded the case to Mize and instructed him to order Meredith's admission to the University. In his majority opinion, Judge John Minor Wisdom called the handling of the case "a carefully calculated campaign of delay, harassment and masterly inactivity."

References

Sources
 

1888 births
1965 deaths
Mississippi College alumni
Judges of the United States District Court for the Southern District of Mississippi
United States district court judges appointed by Franklin D. Roosevelt
20th-century American judges
People from Scott County, Mississippi
University of Mississippi School of Law alumni